He Chun or Her Chyun (和春; died 1860) was a Manchu nobleman and military commander of the Qing dynasty. He Chun was a commander of the northern encampment of the Army Group Jiangnan, a unit of the Green Standard Army tasked to defeat the Taiping rebellion. The northern encampment was based near Yangzhou, before the attack on attack on the Taiping capital, Tianjing (Nanjing). However during the Battle of Jiangnan (1860) he was killed the attack on Nanjing.

References

Year of birth missing
1860 deaths
Manchu people
Qing dynasty generals